The 1990–91 NHL season was the 74th season of the National Hockey League. The Stanley Cup winners were the Pittsburgh Penguins, who won the best of seven series 4–2 against the Minnesota North Stars. This was the last NHL season to end in May.

League business
At meetings in Florida on December 6, 1990, the NHL Board of Governors awarded provisional franchises to groups from Ottawa and Tampa. The Ottawa franchise marked a return to one of the original cities of the NHL, while Tampa meant the first franchise in the sunbelt state of Florida. In a later book published by NHL president Gil Stein, Stein revealed that the two groups were the only ones of the applicants who agreed to the $50 million expansion fee without question. The Ottawa Senators and Tampa Bay Lightning began play in the 1992–93 season.

Regular season

Final standings
Note: W = Wins, L = Losses, T = Ties, GF= Goals For, GA = Goals Against, Pts = Points

Wales Conference

Campbell Conference

Playoffs

Playoff bracket

The North Stars defeated the Edmonton Oilers to become the first Norris Division team to appear in the Stanley Cup Finals since the 1981 realignment. At the time a record of 92 playoff games were played, and for the first time since the 1973 playoffs, no team was swept in a playoff series.

Stanley Cup Finals

Awards

All-Star teams

Player statistics

Scoring leaders

Note: GP = Games played; G = Goals; A = Assists; Pts = Points, PIM = Penalties in minutes, PPG = Powerplay goals, SHG = Shorthanded goals, GWG = Game winning goals

Leading goaltenders

GP = Games played; Min = Minutes played; W = Wins; L = Losses; T = Ties; SO = Shutouts; GAA = Goals against average

Coaches

Patrick Division
New Jersey Devils: John Cunniff and Tom McVie
New York Islanders: Al Arbour
New York Rangers: Roger Neilson
Philadelphia Flyers: Paul Holmgren
Pittsburgh Penguins: Bob Johnson
Washington Capitals: Terry Murray

Adams Division
Boston Bruins: Mike Milbury
Buffalo Sabres: Rick Dudley
Hartford Whalers: Rick Ley
Montreal Canadiens: Pat Burns
Quebec Nordiques: Dave Chambers

Norris Division
Chicago Blackhawks: Mike Keenan
Detroit Red Wings: Bryan Murray
Minnesota North Stars: Bob Gainey
St. Louis Blues: Brian Sutter
Toronto Maple Leafs: Tom Watt

Smythe Division
Calgary Flames: Doug Risebrough
Edmonton Oilers: John Muckler
Los Angeles Kings: Tom Webster
Vancouver Canucks: Bob McCammon and Pat Quinn
Winnipeg Jets: Bob Murdoch

Milestones

Debuts
The following is a list of players of note who played their first NHL game in 1990–91 (listed with their first team, asterisk(*) marks debut in playoffs):

Robert Reichel, Calgary Flames
Dominik Hasek, Chicago Blackhawks
Keith Primeau, Detroit Red Wings
Mike Sillinger, Detroit Red Wings
Sergei Fedorov, Detroit Red Wings
Bobby Holik, Hartford Whalers
Geoff Sanderson, Hartford Whalers
John LeClair, Montreal Canadiens
Patrice Brisebois, Montreal Canadiens
Sean Hill*, Montreal Canadiens
Doug Weight*, New York Rangers
Tony Amonte*, New York Rangers
Mike Ricci, Philadelphia Flyers
Jaromir Jagr, Pittsburgh Penguins
Mats Sundin, Quebec Nordiques
Owen Nolan, Quebec Nordiques
Petr Nedved, Vancouver Canucks
Dmitri Khristich, Washington Capitals
Peter Bondra, Washington Capitals
Kris Draper, Winnipeg Jets

Last games
The following is a list of players of note that played their last game in the NHL in 1990–91 (listed with their last team):
Gord Kluzak, Boston Bruins
Tony McKegney, Chicago Blackhawks
Glen Hanlon, Detroit Red Wings
Don Maloney, New York Islanders
Lindy Ruff, New York Rangers
Pete Peeters, Philadelphia Flyers
Guy Lafleur, Quebec Nordiques
Harold Snepsts, St. Louis Blues
Paul MacLean, St. Louis Blues
Rick Meagher, St. Louis Blues
Stan Smyl, Vancouver Canucks
Joel Quenneville, Washington Capitals

Trading deadline
 Trading Deadline: March 5, 1991
March 4, 1991: Ron Francis, Grant Jennings, and Ulf Samuelsson traded from Hartford to Pittsburgh for John Cullen, Jeff Parker, and Zarley Zalapski.
March 5, 1991: Allan Bester traded from Toronto to Detroit for Detroit's sixth round pick in 1991 Entry Draft.
March 5, 1991: Geoff Courtnall, Robert Dirk, Sergio Momesso, Cliff Ronning, and future considerations traded from St. Louis to Vancouver for Dan Quinn and Garth Butcher.
March 5, 1991: Mark Hunter traded from Calgary to Hartford for Carey Wilson.
March 5, 1991: Mark Pederson traded from Montreal to Philadelphia for Philadelphia's second round pick in 1991 Entry Draft and future considerations.
March 5, 1991: Keith Osborne traded from St. Louis to Toronto for Darren Veitch and future considerations.
March 5, 1991: Ken Priestlay traded from Buffalo to Pittsburgh for Tony Tanti.
March 5, 1991: Dana Murzyn traded from Calgary to Vancouver for Ron Stern, Kevan Guy and future considerations.
March 5, 1991: Kim Issel traded from Edmonton to Pittsburgh for Brad Aitken.
March 5, 1991: Steve Weeks traded from Vancouver to Buffalo for future considerations.
March 5, 1991: Marc Bureau traded from Calgary to Minnesota for Minnesota's third round choice in 1991 Entry Draft.
March 5, 1991: Joey Kocur and Per Djoos traded from Detroit to NY Rangers for Kevin Miller, Jim Cummins, and Dennis Vial.
March 5, 1991: Bobby Reynolds traded from Toronto to Washington for Robert Mendel.
March 5, 1991: Mike McNeill and Ryan McGill traded from Chicago to Quebec for Paul Gillis and Dan Vincelette.
March 5, 1991: Ilkka Sinisalo traded from Minnesota to Los Angeles for Los Angeles' eighth round choice in 1991 Entry Draft.

See also
List of Stanley Cup champions
1990 NHL Entry Draft
42nd National Hockey League All-Star Game
National Hockey League All-Star Game
NHL All-Rookie Team
1990 in sports
1991 in sports

References
 
 
 
 
Notes

External links
 1990-91 Regular Season Scoring Leaders - quanthockey.com
 1990-91 Regular Season Goaltender Leaders - quanthockey.com
 Hockey Database
 http://nhl.com/

 

 
1990–91 in Canadian ice hockey by league
1990–91 in American ice hockey by league